The Cromer's Mill Covered Bridge, spanning Nails Creek near Carnesville, Georgia, was built in 1907.  It was listed on the National Register of Historic Places in 1976.

It is a Town Lattice truss bridge.  It has also been known as Nails Creek Covered Bridge.

The bridge rests on stone abutments at its ends and a central pier.  A steel truss made of 12-inch steel I-beams was added under the north end of the bridge. And later a single wooden pole was installed to support one side of the bridge.

See also
List of covered bridges in Georgia

References

Covered bridges in Georgia (U.S. state)
National Register of Historic Places in Franklin County, Georgia
Bridges completed in 1907